The 2018–19 Fordham Rams men's basketball team represented Fordham University during the 2018–19 NCAA Division I men's basketball season. The Rams, led by fourth-year head coach Jeff Neubauer, played their home games at Rose Hill Gymnasium in The Bronx, New York as a member of the Atlantic 10 Conference. They finished the season 12-20, 3-15 in A-10 Play to finish in last place. They lost in the first round of the A-10 tournament to Richmond.

Previous season
The Rams finished the 2017–18 season 9–22, 4–14 in A-10 play to finish in last place. They lost in the first round of the A-10 tournament to George Washington.

Offseason

Departures

2018 recruiting class

2019 recruiting class

Roster

Schedule and results

|-
!colspan=9 style=| Non-conference regular season

|-
!colspan=9 style=| Atlantic 10 regular season

|-
!colspan=9 style=| Atlantic 10 tournament

Source

See also
 2018–19 Fordham Rams women's basketball team

References

Fordham
Fordham Rams men's basketball seasons
Fordham
Fordham